S.V.H.College of Engineering is an unaided institution in Machilipatnam, Andhra Pradesh, India. It was established in 1980 by the Hindu High and Branch School Society to provide engineering education, in particular to students from the Coastal Districts.  The college is privately managed and owes its existence to the efforts of the members of the Society, particularly Sri. D.Madhusudhana Sastry, a leading advocate of  Machilipatnam, Sri. K.P. Mallikarjunudu, an ex-MPF and Public Prosecutor, Smt. T.Kotamma Reddy, an ex-M.L.A. in the composite Madras presidency and a retired first class magistrate, and Sri. D. Achyuta Rao, a businessman.

External links 
 S.V.H College of Engineering, Machilipatnam official website
 Home page of 1995 batch

Educational institutions established in 1980
1980 establishments in Andhra Pradesh
Machilipatnam
Universities and colleges in Krishna district
Engineering colleges in Krishna district
Engineering colleges in Andhra Pradesh
Engineering universities and colleges in India
Hindu universities and colleges